Emil Ketterer (6 August 1883 – 23 December 1959) was a German track and field athlete who competed in the 1912 Summer Olympics. Later in his life, he became an ardent Nazi and SA-Obergruppenführer. As a medical doctor, he was involved in approval and promotion of euthanasia under the Nazi regime. He was father-in-law of Hanns-Martin Schleyer, SS officer and victim of the Red Army Faction.

Born in Neustadt, he studied at the Ludwig Maximilian University of Munich, where he specialized in internal medicine and sports medicine. In 1912 Summer Olympics, he was eliminated in the first round of the 100 metres competition as he was not able to finish his race due to an injury.

He participated in World War I as a medical officer in the Bavarian army. After the war, Ketterer joined Bayerische Volkspartei and was involved in the Freikorps' clashes with left-wing radicals. As a member of the Reichskriegsflagge organisation, he took part in Hitler's Beer Hall Putsch, for which he was awarded the Nazi Blood Order,  and in 1925 he became the NSDAP (Membership number 697). He joined SA in 1931 and was its Chief of Medical Services until 1937.

From 1933, Ketterer was a Munich City councillor. From 1936 to 1945, he was chairman of the TSV 1860 München sports club. He died in Munich.

His daughter Waltrude (1916–2008) was the wife of Hanns-Martin Schleyer, who was murdered by Red Army Faction terrorists in 1977.

References

Further reading
CAMPBELL, Bruce: The SA Generals and the Rise of Nazism. Lexington, Kentucky, University Press of Kentucky, 2004

External links
 
 list of German athletes

1883 births
1959 deaths
Sturmabteilung officers
Olympic athletes of Germany
Athletes (track and field) at the 1912 Summer Olympics
German male sprinters
Ludwig Maximilian University of Munich alumni
Physicians in the Nazi Party
German Army personnel of World War I
German military doctors
People from Breisgau-Hochschwarzwald
Sportspeople from Freiburg (region)
People from the Grand Duchy of Baden
20th-century Freikorps personnel